The 2000 Anaheim Angels season involved the Angels finishing 3rd in the American League West with a record of 82 wins and 80 losses.

The Angels had an extremely powerful offense, with five players (Garret Anderson, Darin Erstad, Troy Glaus, Tim Salmon, and Mo Vaughn) hitting at least 25 homers and driving in 97 runs. Glaus led the AL in HRs, and Erstad had the most hits on his way to a .355 batting average. However, the pitching was very inconsistent. Reliever Shigetoshi Hasegawa led the team with 10 wins. Scott Schoeneweis led all starting pitchers in innings pitched with 170 and also led all starters (qualifying for ERA title) with a 5.45 ERA.

Offseason
January 11, 2000: Scott Spiezio was signed as a free agent with the Anaheim Angels.
March 23, 2000: Kent Bottenfield was traded by the St. Louis Cardinals with Adam Kennedy to the Anaheim Angels for Jim Edmonds.

Regular season

Notable transactions
July 29, 2000: Kent Bottenfield was traded by the Anaheim Angels to the Philadelphia Phillies for Ron Gant.

Season standings

Record vs. opponents

Roster

Player stats

Batting

Starters by position
Note: Pos = Position; G = Games played; AB = At bats; H = Hits; Avg. = Batting average; HR = Home runs; RBI = Runs batted in

Other batters
Note: G = Games played; AB = At bats; H = Hits; Avg. = Batting average; HR = Home runs; RBI = Runs batted in

Pitching

Starting pitchers
Note: G = Games pitched; IP = Innings pitched; W = Wins; L = Losses; ERA = Earned run average; SO = Strikeouts

Other pitchers 
Note: G = Games pitched; IP = Innings pitched; W = Wins; L = Losses; ERA = Earned run average; SO = Strikeouts

Relief pitchers 
Note: G = Games pitched; W = Wins; L = Losses; SV = Saves; ERA = Earned run average; SO = Strikeouts

Awards and league leaders
Darin Erstad
 All-Star
 AL Gold Glove (OF)
 AL Silver Slugger Award (OF)
 AL leader in hits (240)
 #2 in AL in batting average (.355)
 #3 in AL in runs scored (121)

Troy Glaus
 All-Star
 AL Silver Slugger Award (3B)
 AL leader in home runs (47)
 #5 in AL in runs scored (120)

Farm system

References

2000 Anaheim Angels at Baseball Reference
2000 Anaheim Angels at Baseball Almanac

Los Angeles Angels seasons
Anaheim Angels
Los